Clement Terence Chiwaya (16 May 1971 – 30 September 2021) was a Malawian politician who served as an MP for Mangochi Central from 2004 to 2019. He was also Minister of Social Development and Persons with Disabilities from 2004 through 2005.

Biography 
Clement Terence Chiwaya was born on 16 May 1971.  His home village was Mpondasi, located in Mponda Traditional Authority (TA) area of Mangochi District.  At the age of two, Chiwaya contracted polio and became paraplegic. He was raised by the Diocese of Mangochi due to his disability.

In the late 1990s, Chiwaya found a Calvin College advertisement offering scholarships for students from Africa. In 1998, he flew to Grand Rapids to enter the college, carrying US$500. When he arrived, Calvin College admissions officers informed him that he would need to go back to Malawi and formally apply for the following year. Chiwaya then sought help from the Diocese of Grand Rapids; they arranged for his boarding and enrollment in Aquinas College. He completed his bachelor's degree at Aquinas College in 2002, with a double major in Community Leadership and Political Science.

After returning to Malawi, Chiwaya entered politics as a member of the United Democratic Front (UDF) party.  He was elected to the National Assembly from Mangochi Central in the 2004 general election, holding the seat for the UDF.  He was appointed the first Minister of Social Development and Persons with Disabilities a week after the election, and continued in this position through 2005.

Chiwaya was reelected in 2009 and became the Chief Whip for the UDF.  After winning a third term in 2014, he became the Second Deputy Speaker of the National Assembly.  In 2018, he decided not to run for another term.  At the following election in 2019, his former seat was won by Victoria Kingston of the Democratic Progressive Party.

Chiwaya was appointed Minister of Persons with Disability and the Elderly in March 2020, serving until after the presidential election in June.

Death 
On 30 September 2021, Chiwaya committed suicide after not receiving insurance from parliament to pay for damages to his car.

His funeral was held in Mangochi Stadium on 2 October 2021, and he was buried in Mpondasi.

Electoral history

References

External links 
 Fighting stigma and social inequality: Dr. Clement Chiwaya at TEDxGrandRapids (2014)

1971 births
2021 deaths
2021 suicides
Members of the National Assembly (Malawi)
Suicides by firearm in Malawi
Politicians who committed suicide
United Democratic Front (Malawi) politicians
Aquinas College (Michigan) alumni
Government ministers of Malawi
Politicians with paraplegia
Malawian people with disabilities
People from Mangochi District
Wheelchair users